The Exiles rugby league team is an international rugby league team that plays in the International Origin series against England. The Exiles team is made up of Australian, New Zealand and Pacific Island players contracted to Super League clubs.

The Exiles team wear a black jersey with green and gold vee. Each player also has a small flag of their origin nation on their shirts.

Team selection
The Exiles rugby league team is selected from the overseas players in the Super League competition. These players are chosen to form a 23-man squad by a foreign coach (usually an Australian or New Zealand coach).

History
The Other Nationalities rugby league team regularly played international, and also county, rugby league football teams in Europe from 1904 to 1975. The team, created in 1904 to play England in the first ever rugby league international match, was at first made up of Welsh and Scottish players. However, as rugby league in England grew, and more players from other countries were brought over to England to play in the domestic competitions, Other Nationalities were later represented by players from Ireland, South Africa, Australia and New Zealand.

Due to the success of the All Stars match in Australia between the Indigenous All Stars and the NRL All Stars, new England head coach Steve McNamara proposed a plan to revive the concept of the Other Nationalities team in 2011 in a hope of providing England with a more challenging opposition in preparation of playing and staying competitive against nations like Australia and New Zealand after the 2010 thrashing of France 60–6 followed by England's poor results in the 2010 Four Nations Tournament.

The match – branded by the Rugby Football League as the International Origin Match – took place on 10 June 2011, replacing the Gillet Fusion mid-season test against France, who in turn will meet England at the end of the Super League season as part of England's build-up to the Four Nations. All Super League clubs agreed to the concept with a maximum of two players per club to be selected for the squad by public vote from rugby league fans and coach Brian McLennan. The 'Exiles' banner defeated England 16–12 with a try in the dying stages of the match at Headingley, Leeds.

2013 squad
2013 Exiles squad to date.

Results

See also
Other Nationalities rugby league team

External links
England Rugby League Team official website

 
National rugby league teams
Rugby league in England
2011 establishments in England
Rugby clubs established in 2011